Jameh Mosque of Bastak is located in Bastak, Hormozgan Province, in Southern Iran.

References

Mosques in Iran
Mosque buildings with domes
National works of Iran